Monte Falterona is a mountain in the Tuscan-Romagnolo Apeninnes, in the Casentino traditional region, standing at 1,654 m. It is part of the Casentino forests, Monte Falterona and Campigna National Park. The peak is crossed by the borders of the provinces of Florence, Arezzo and Forlì-Cesena. The mountain, mostly composed of sandstone, is covered by beeches and, from one of its sides, the Arno River springs.

On the east is a grassy depression with the relic of an ancient lake known as the Lago degli Idoli. The lake has been important from an archaeological perspective as numerous Etruscan statuettes have been found, now distributed across a number of Western museums, including the Louvre, Hermitage and British Museum.

References

Mountains of the Apennines
One-thousanders of Italy
Mountains of Tuscany
Mountains of Emilia-Romagna
Monte Falterona
Monte Falterona
Monte Falterona